The Third Avenue station is a station on the BMT Canarsie Line of the New York City Subway. Located at the intersection of Third Avenue and East 14th Street in East Village, Manhattan, it is served by the L train at all times.

History 
This station opened on June 30, 1924, as part of the 14th Street–Eastern Line station, which ran from Sixth Avenue under the East River and through Williamsburg to Montrose and Bushwick Avenues.

Station layout

West of the station there is a double crossover. The platforms are column-less and have the standard BMT style trim-line and name tablets. The former contains "3" tablets in standard intervals while the latter consists of "THIRD AVE" in seriffed lettering.

There are also directions signs to the station's only entrances/exits saying "TO STREET" in the same style as the name tablets. Each platform has its own same-level fare control at the extreme west (railroad north) end. As a result, there is no free transfer between directions. This station is identical to the next one east (railroad south), First Avenue except that the fare control areas there are at a small mezzanine above the platforms.

Third Avenue is one of only two stations along the Canarsie Line in Manhattan that does not contain a transfer to another line. The other station is the nearby First Avenue Subway station. However, a transfer station is planned to the 14th Street station of the Second Avenue Subway, as part of Phase 3 of construction from 55th Street to Houston Street.

Exits
Each platform-level fare control area has a bank of turnstiles, token booth, and two street stairs apiece—one to the east side of Third Avenue and East 14th Street, the other to East 14th Street just east of Third Avenue. The stairs on the Eighth Avenue-bound side lead to the northeast corner while the ones on the Brooklyn-bound side lead to the southeast corner.

Experimental platform doors
As part of a pilot program, each platform at the Third Avenue station was supposed be refitted with 32 half-height platform screen doors (PSDs) while the 14th Street Tunnel was being rebuilt from April 2019 to March 2020. This had been possible as a result of the L train's automated train operation, as well as the route's exclusive use of  subway cars with four doors, which allow trains to stop at the same part of the platform every time. The MTA would have used the results of the pilot in order to determine the feasibility of adding such doors citywide.

To ensure that the subway car is precisely lined up with the doors, a wayside-only berthing system would be installed. Emergency egress gates would be installed in between the regular doors to allow people to exit in the case of an emergency. The platform edges and topping would be removed and replaced so that they align with the sills of the train doors and to be in compliance with the Americans with Disabilities Act of 1990. To ensure that people do not get trapped in between the subway car doors and the PSDs, sensors and CCTV cameras would be installed with monitors at the center and front of the platforms visible to the train operator and conductor.

In June 2018, the $30 million for the platform edge door pilot program was diverted to another project along the Canarsie Line: the installation of elevators at the Sixth Avenue station. The pilot program was postponed until sufficient funding could be found. In February 2022, the MTA announced that the PSD installation at Third Avenue would proceed as part of a pilot program involving three stations. The announcement came after several people had been shoved onto tracks, including one incident that led to a woman's death at another station. The MTA started soliciting bids from platform-door manufacturers in mid-2022; the doors are planned to be installed starting in April 2023 at a cost of $6 million.

References

External links 

 
 Station Reporter — L Train
 The Subway Nut — 3rd Avenue Pictures
 Third Avenue entrance from Google Maps Street View
 Platforms from Google Maps Street View

BMT Canarsie Line stations
New York City Subway stations in Manhattan
Railway stations in the United States opened in 1924
Gramercy Park
East Village, Manhattan
Proposed IND Second Avenue Line stations
14th Street (Manhattan)